Taisnières-sur-Hon (literally Taisnières on Hon) is a commune in the Nord department in northern France.

Heraldry

See also
 Battle of Malplaquet, which took place near the hamlet of Malplaquet, on the territory of the commune, in 1709
 Communes of the Nord department

References

Taisnieressurhon